Egzon Bejtulai (born 7 January 1994) is a Macedonian professional footballer who plays for KF Shkëndija and North Macedonia national football team as a defender.

Club career

International career
Bejtulai is of Albanian Macedonian descent. Bejtulai was a regular in the Macedonia U21 team and performed at the 2017 UEFA European Under-21 Championship in Poland, where he served as first right back choice.

In May 2016 and March 2017 he also received call-ups for Macedonia in friendlies against Azerbaijan, Iran and Belarus, but he did not make his debut until 6 September 2018 during the first round of the 2018–19 UEFA Nations League D competition, when he entered the game against Gibraltar in the 85th minute.

During North Macedonia's opening fixture of the tournament against Austria, immediatedly after striker Marko Arnautović (who is half-Serbian) scored, Arnautović angrily shouted towards Bejtulai and teammate Ezgjan Alioski –both of Albanian descent–what were believed to be anti-Albanian slurs. Football Federation of Macedonia released a statement calling for action by UEFA.

References

External links
 
 
 
 

1994 births
Living people
People from Tetovo
Albanian footballers from North Macedonia
Association football defenders
Macedonian footballers
North Macedonia international footballers
North Macedonia youth international footballers
FK Teteks players
KF Shkëndija players
Helsingborgs IF players
Macedonian First Football League players
UEFA Euro 2020 players
Macedonian expatriate footballers
Expatriate footballers in Sweden
Macedonian expatriate sportspeople in Sweden
North Macedonia under-21 international footballers